Dargwa (dargan mez) is a Northeast Caucasian language spoken by the Dargin people in the Russian republic Dagestan. It is the literary and main dialect of the dialect continuum constituting the Dargin languages.

Classification 
Dargwa is part of a Northeast Caucasian dialect continuum, the Dargin languages. The four other languages in this dialect continuum (Kajtak, Kubachi, Itsari, and Chirag) are often considered variants of Dargwa. Korjakov (2012) concludes that Southwestern Dargwa is closer to Kajtak than it is to North-Central Dargwa.

Geographic distribution 

According to the 2002 Census, there are 429,347 speakers of Dargwa proper in Dagestan, 7,188 in neighbouring Kalmykia, 1,620 in Khanty–Mansi AO, 680 in Chechnya, and hundreds more in other parts of Russia. Figures for the Lakh dialect spoken in central Dagestan are 142,523 in Dagestan, 1,504 in Kabardino-Balkaria, 708 in Khanty–Mansi.

Phonology

Consonants 
Like other languages of the Caucasus, Dargwa is noted for its large consonant inventory, which includes over 40 phonemes (distinct sounds), though the exact number varies by dialect. Voicing, glottalization (as ejectives), fortition (which surfaces as gemination), and frication are some of the distinct features of consonants in Dargwa. Particularly noteworthy is the inclusion of an epiglottal ejective by some dialects such as Mehweb, which it may be the only language in the world to use phonemically.

 Present in the literary standard of Dargwa, but not some other dialects.
 Present in some dialects, but not the literary standard.
 The source is rather ambiguous in its using the term "laryngeal" for a presumed column of consonants that includes both a "voiced" and a "glottalized" plosive. A voiced glottal plosive cannot be made, because the glottis needs to be closed, and an ejective consonant requires an additional closure further up the vocal tract. Pending clarification, this row has been transcribed here as an epiglottal column and a glottal stop, both found in many other East Caucasian languages.

Vowels 

The Dargwa language features five vowel sounds /i, e, ə, a, u/. Vowels /i, u, a/ can be pharyngealized as /iˤ, uˤ, aˤ/. There may also be a pharyngealized mid-back vowel [oˤ] as a realization of /uˤ/, occurring in the Megeb dialect.

Orthography

The current Dargwa alphabet is based on Cyrillic as follows:

Grammar

Verb

TAM

Assertive (finite) forms

Kadar dialect
The Kadar dialect (G'adaran lug'at) with 18.000 speakers is a dialect of the Northern Dargin languages, one of the Dargin languages, which is characterized by specific phonetic, morphological, lexical and syntactic features. It is traditionally regarded as a single dialect of Dargwa. The vocabulary layer of the Kadar dialect includes words borrowed from Arabic, Persian, Russian and especially Turkic.

References

Bibliography 
 Z. G. Abdullaev: Darginskij jazyk (3 Vol.). Moskau 1993. (in Russian)
 Z. G. Abdullaev: Darginskij jazyk. In: Jazyki narodov SSSR. Vol. 4. Moskau 1967. (in Russian)
 Karl Bouda: Die darginische Schriftsprache. (= Beiträge zur kaukasischen und sibirischen Sprachwissenschaft. Vol. 4). Leipzig 1937.
 Helma van den Berg: Dargi folktales. Oral stories from the Caucasus. With an introduction to Dargi Grammar. Leiden 2001.
 Michael Daniel, Nina Dobrushina, Dmitry Ganenkov (eds.): The Mehweb language: Essays on phonology, morphology and syntax. Language Science Press, Berlin 2019, . Open Access langsci-press.org DOI:10.5281/zenodo.3374730

External links 
 An online dictionary of Sanzhi Dargwa (in Dictionaria), by Diana Forker
 Appendix:Cyrillic script
 Dargin language 
Consonant Systems of the North-East Caucasian Languages
 Dargwa basic lexicon at the Global Lexicostatistical Database
 Sanzhi Dargwa DoReCo corpus compiled by Diana Forker and Nils Norman Schiborr. Audio recordings of narrative texts with transcriptions time-aligned at the phone level, translations, and - for some texts - time-aligned morphological annotations.

 
Northeast Caucasian languages
Languages of Russia
Dagestan